The Leader of the Opposition of the Karnataka Legislative Assembly is the politician who leads the official opposition in the Karnataka Legislative Assembly. Incumbent Leader of opposition is Siddaramaiah.

Leaders of opposition

References 

Indian politicians
Karnataka
Karnataka politics-related lists